The Keep Moving Tour is a cancelled concert tour by Australian hard rock musician Andrew Stockdale in support of his debut solo album Keep Moving. The tour was scheduled for two legs in Australia and the United States between July and August 2013, but as of 21 July 2013 the entire tour is cancelled.

Background
Andrew Stockdale originally announced his debut solo tour in April 2013, scheduling 14 shows for the opening Australian leg between 6 and 29 June. The support act was later announced as The Delta Riggs, featuring Stockdale band member Elliott Hammond. In June however, the day before the first scheduled show in Newcastle, New South Wales, Stockdale announced that the Australian leg of the tour had been postponed due to "international commitments", with only the album launch show at The Metro Theatre in Sydney remaining. The tour would later visit the United States for 24 shows throughout July and August.

In July 2013, it was announced that all Andrew Stockdale Keep Moving tour dates had been cancelled, and that his old band Wolfmother would reunite to perform a number of shows in the United States. As of 21 July 2013, it is not yet known whether any of the Keep Moving shows will be rescheduled, either as Andrew Stockdale or as Wolfmother.

Set list
The following is the set list from the 7 June 2013 concert at The Metro Theatre in Sydney, New South Wales.
"Somebody's Calling"
"Long Way to Go"
"Keep Moving"
"Woman"
"White Unicorn"
"New Moon Rising"
"Let Somebody Love You"
"Everyday Drone"
"Suitcase (One More Time)"
"Apple Tree"
"White Feather"
"Vicarious"
"Colossal"
"Joker & the Thief"
Encore
"Dimension"

Tour dates

Personnel
Andrew Stockdale – lead vocals, lead guitar
Ian Peres – bass, keyboards, backing vocals
Vin Steele – rhythm guitar
Elliott Hammond – drums

References

2013 concert tours